Magnetic Man is the debut album by the English dubstep supergroup of the same name. It was released on 8 October 2010 via Startime International. It features vocals provided by different guest vocalists, including Katy B and Ms. Dynamite.

Singles
 "I Need Air" was the first single released from the album, it was released on 23 July 2010 and reached number 10 on the UK Singles Chart, it also charted in Belgium.
 "Perfect Stranger" was the second single released from the album featuring Katy B. It was released on 1 October 2010 and reached number 16 on the UK Singles Chart.
 "Getting Nowhere" was the third single released from the album. It was released on 18 February 2011 and reached number 65 on the UK Singles Chart.
 "Anthemic" was the fourth single to have been released from the album. To accompany the release, grime rapper P Money was added to the track – the version received its debut performance in May 2011; with the single released on 22 July 2011.

Track listing

Chart performance

Release history

References

2010 debut albums
Dubstep albums
Startime International albums